Al Allabni is a sub-district located in the Al Bayda District, Al Bayda Governorate, Yemen. Al Allabni had a population of 1933 according to the 2004 census.

References 

Sub-districts in Al Bayda District